Branimir Vujević (born 29 November 1974 in Zadar) is a Croatian rower who won a bronze medal in the eights competition at the 2000 Summer Olympics in Sydney. His teammates were Igor Boraska, Nikša Skelin, Siniša Skelin, Krešimir Čuljak, Tomislav Smoljanović, Tihomir Franković and Igor Francetić.

External links
databaseOlympic.com

1974 births
Living people
Croatian male rowers
Rowers at the 2000 Summer Olympics
Olympic rowers of Croatia
Olympic bronze medalists for Croatia
Olympic medalists in rowing

Medalists at the 2000 Summer Olympics
Mediterranean Games gold medalists for Croatia
Competitors at the 1997 Mediterranean Games
Mediterranean Games medalists in rowing